Waterdown was a hardcore punk and post-hardcore band from Osnabrück, Germany. The band emerged onto the scene in 1999 under the formation of: Axel Pralat (guitar), Marcel Bischoff (vocals), Jörg Schwoeppe (drums), Christian Kruse (bass), Holger Behrens (guitar), and Ingo Rieser (vocals). The band was signed to Victory Records up until the mid-2000s. The band's first release was Never Kill the Boy on the First Date, which put them on the map in both Europe and America. This was followed by their second release The Files You Have on Me. They then toured until one of their vocalists (Bischoff) left the group in 2004. Eventually they found their current singer, Michael "Zacken" Janczak. After acquiring Janczak, production on their following album All Riot began immediately. The album was released on January 24, 2006. Sometime between the release of All Riot and the EP Powersnake, Ingo Rieser left the ensemble. The band put out the EP Powersnake and a final record Into the Flames, until they called it quits in 2012.

Members
Axel Pralat – guitar/backing vocals (1999-2002; 2003-2012)
Michael "Zacken" Janczak – lead vocals (2004-2012)
Philipp Meyer – drums (2002-2012)
Christian Kruse – bass/backing vocals (1999-2012)
Holger Behrens – guitar (1999-2012)
Ingo Rieser – co-lead vocals (1999-????)
Marcel Bischoff – lead vocals (1999-2004)
Claus Wilgenbusch - guitar (2002)
Jörg Schwoeppe - drums (1999-2002)

Discography

Studio albums
Never Kill the Boy on the First Date (2001, Victory)
The Files You Have on Me (2003, Victory)
All Riot (2006, Victory)
Into the Flames (2012, Uncle M)

EPs
Draw a Smiling Face (2000, Two Friends Recordings)
Powersnake (2008, Blacktop)

References

External links
Waterdown website
Purevolume site
Victory Records

German heavy metal musical groups
Musical groups established in 1999
Victory Records artists
1999 establishments in Germany